Frank Roy Davis (August 25, 1888 – September 17, 1948) was a Canadian politician. He represented the electoral district of Lunenburg in the Nova Scotia House of Assembly from 1933 to 1948. He was a member of the Nova Scotia Liberal Party.

Davis was born in 1888 at Shelburne, Nova Scotia. He was educated at Mount Allison University, and Dalhousie University, and was a physician and surgeon by career. He married Elizabeth Euphemia Balcom in 1913.

Davis was elected mayor of Bridgewater, Nova Scotia in 1930. He entered provincial politics in the 1933 election, winning a seat for the dual-member Lunenburg riding with Liberal Gordon E. Romkey. Davis was re-elected in the 1937, 1941, and 1945 elections. He served in the Executive Council of Nova Scotia as Minister of Health and Welfare, Registrar General and Minister of Municipal Affairs. He died in office on September 17, 1948.

References

1888 births
1948 deaths
Dalhousie University alumni
Mayors of places in Nova Scotia
Members of the Executive Council of Nova Scotia
Nova Scotia Liberal Party MLAs
Nova Scotia Ministers of Health
People from Lunenburg County, Nova Scotia
People from Shelburne County, Nova Scotia